The 2019 Empress's Cup was the 42th season of the Japanese women's football main cup competition.

Calendar and schedule 
Below are the dates for each round as given by the official schedule:

First round

Round of 32

Round of 16

Quarter-finals

Semi-finals

Final

References

Empress's Cup
2019 in Japanese women's football